The Pan-American Exposition was a World's Fair held in Buffalo, New York, United States, from May 1 through November 2, 1901. The fair occupied  of land on the western edge of what is now Delaware Park, extending from Delaware Avenue to Elmwood Avenue and northward to Great Arrow Avenue. It is remembered today primarily for being the location of the assassination of United States President William McKinley at the Temple of Music on September 6, 1901. The exposition was illuminated at night. Thomas A. Edison, Inc. filmed it during the day and a pan of it at night.

History

The event was organized by the Pan-American Exposition Company, formed in 1897. Cayuga Island was initially chosen as the place to hold the Exposition because of the island's proximity to Niagara Falls, which was a huge tourist attraction. When the Spanish–American War broke out in 1898, plans were put on hold. After the war, there was a heated competition between the cities of Buffalo and Niagara Falls over the location. Buffalo won for two main reasons. First, Buffalo had a much larger population; with roughly 350,000 people, it was the eighth-largest city in the United States. Second, Buffalo had better railroad connections; the city was within a day's journey by rail for over 40 million people. In July 1898, Congress pledged $500,000 for the Exposition to be held at Buffalo. The "Pan American" theme was carried throughout the event with the slogan "commercial well being and good understanding among the American Republics."

Assassination of President McKinley

The exposition is most remembered because United States President William McKinley was assassinated by an anarchist, Leon Czolgosz, at the Temple of Music on September 6, 1901. The President died eight days later on September 14 from gangrene caused by the bullet wounds.

On the day prior to the shooting, McKinley had given an address at the exposition, which began as follows:

The newly developed X-ray machine was displayed at the fair, but doctors were reluctant to use it on McKinley to search for the bullet because they did not know what side effects it might have had on him.  Also, the operating room at the exposition's emergency hospital did not have any electric lighting, even though the exteriors of many of the buildings were covered with thousands of light bulbs.  Doctors used a pan to reflect sunlight onto the operating table as they treated McKinley's wounds.

Buildings and exhibits
Buildings and exhibits featured at the Pan-American Exposition included:

Attractions

The Court of Fountains, the central court to the exposition.
The Great Amphitheater
The Triumphal Bridge, which was positioned over the "Mirror Lake".
Joshua Slocum's sloop, the Spray, on which he had recently sailed around the world alone.
A Trip to the Moon, a mechanical dark ride that was later housed at Coney Island's Luna Park.
In the center of the rose-garden beside the Woman's Building was Enid Yandell's "Struggle of Existence," a plaster version of the fountain "Struggle of Life" installed in Rhode Island

Lina Beecher, creator of the Flip Flap Railway, attempted to demonstrate one of his looping roller coasters at the fair, but the organizers of the event considered the ride to be too dangerous and refused to allow it on the grounds. Buffalo native Nina Morgana, later a soprano with the Metropolitan Opera, was a child performer in the "Venice in America" attraction at the Exposition. Composer/organist Fannie Morris Spencer gave two recitals in the Temple of Music.

Demolition
When the fair ended, the contents of the grounds were sold to the Chicago House Wrecking Company of Chicago for US$92,000 ($ in  dollars). Demolition of the buildings began in March 1902, and within a year, most of the buildings were demolished. The grounds were then cleared and subdivided to be used for residential streets, homes, and park land. Similar to previous world fairs, most of the buildings were constructed of timber and steel framing with precast staff panels made of a plaster/fiber mix. These buildings were built as a means of rapid construction and temporary ornamentation and not made to last. Prior to its demolition, an effort was made via public committee to purchase and preserve the original Electric Tower from the wrecking company for nearly US$30,000 ($ in  dollars). However, the necessary funding could not be raised in time.

The site of the exposition was bounded by Elmwood Avenue on the west, Delaware Avenue on the east, what is now Hoyt Lake on the south, and the railway on the north.  It is now occupied by a residential neighborhood from Nottingham Terrace to Amherst Street, and businesses on the north side of Amherst Street.  A stone and marker on a traffic island dividing Fordham Drive, near the Lincoln Parkway, marks the area where the Temple of Music was located.

Legacy
The New York State Building, located in Delaware Park, was designed to outlast the Exposition and is now used as a museum by the Buffalo History Museum.  Designated a National Historic Landmark in 1987, it can be visited at the corner of Elmwood Avenue and Nottingham Avenue. The Museum's Research Library has an online bibliography of its extensive Pan-American holdings. Included in the Library collection are the records of the Pan-American Exposition Company.
The Albright-Knox Art Gallery was intended to serve as a Fine Arts Pavilion but due to construction delays, it was not completed in time.
The original Electric Tower, although demolished, was the inspiration and design prototype for the 13 story, Beaux-Arts Electric Tower, built in 1912, in downtown Buffalo. The Hotel Statler was likewise demolished before Statler built a replacement in 1907, then another replacement in 1923.
A boulder with a plaque and a flagpole marking the site of McKinley's assassination was placed in the grassy median on Fordham Drive in Buffalo.
At least one engine from the miniature railway that carried visitors around the fair was preserved. It is currently privately owned and operated in Braddock Heights, Maryland.

Statistics
Ticket Cost: US$0.50($ in  dollars).
Total Event Expense: US$7 million($ in  dollars)
Visitors: 8,000,000

See also
Put Me Off at Buffalo – popular song used to advertise the Exposition
List of world's fairs
Louisiana Purchase Exposition
Raphael Beck
World's Columbian Exposition
List of world expositions

References

Further reading
Margaret Creighton (October 18, 2016). Electrifying Fall of Rainbow City: Spectacle and Assassination at the 1901 World's Fair. .

External links

Doing the Pan: Pan-American Exposition at Buffalo in 1901
New York Heritage Digital Collections: Pan-American Exposition Scrapbooks
University at Buffalo Library: Pan-American Exposition of 1901
University at Buffalo Digital Collections: Pan-American Exposition of 1901
Pan-American Exposition: A Visual Guide to buildings, fountains, sculpture, hotels, landscape features, and the Midway] compiled by the Buffalo History Museum.
Pan-American Exposition Company Records: An inventory of the collection in the Research Library at The Buffalo History Museum. The business records are not digitized or online, so an in-person visit is needed to study them.
Pan-American Exposition: List of Prizes, compiled by The Buffalo History Museum
Pan-American Exposition Then and Now: A map of the grounds with an overlay of modern streets, created by The Buffalo History Museum
1901 Buffalo - approximately 120 links
The Shapell Manuscript Foundation: Pan-American Exposition souvenir booklet autographed by William McKinley

World's fairs in New York (state)
1901 in the United States
20th century in Buffalo, New York
Exposition
Assassination of William McKinley
1901 in New York (state)
Articles containing video clips
1901 festivals
Events in Buffalo, New York